Hemingway is a crater on Mercury. It has a patch of very dark material located near its center. The dark color is likely due to rocks that have a different mineralogical composition from that of the surrounding surface.

The crater's name was adopted by the International Astronomical Union (IAU) in 2009. It is named for the American author Ernest Hemingway.

Dark interior crater
The dark crater near the center of Hemingway is truly black, and due to its superposition over the other structures in the crater, it is a young feature.

References

Impact craters on Mercury
Ernest Hemingway